Moore River in Western Australia can refer to a number of places:

 Moore River, the river itself
Moore River National Park, national park that the river runs through
Guilderton, Western Australia, the township at the river mouth, often referred to by locals as Moore River
Moore River Native Settlement, a disbanded aboriginal settlement 10 km west of Mogumber